Lucy Charlotte Pearson (born 19 February 1972) is a teacher and former English cricketer who played 12 Women's Test matches and 62 Women's One Day Internationals. Pearson also played in the inaugural Women's Twenty20 International, taking one wicket against New Zealand.

A left-arm fast-medium opening bowler, her best performance was against Australia, taking 7–51 in the first innings of the second Test in 2003, winning the Player of the Match award for match figures of 58–21–107–11, becoming only the second English woman to take 11 wickets against Australia in over 70 years. As a result, Pearson was named (2003) Women's Player of the Year for the second time, having taken the inaugural award in 2000. She was also nominated 2005. After guiding England to the semi-finals of the 2005 Women's Cricket World Cup in South Africa, Pearson was forced to retire with a recurrence of the stress fracture to her ankle that forced her to miss most of the 2002 season.

Pearson read English at Keble College, Oxford University, where she also played hockey. She spent three and a half years as Head of Sixth Form at Solihull School, where she sang in the school choir and coached the cricket and hockey XIs. In 2006, she took up a post as Deputy Head of Wellington College, also teaching English and she is a member of the cricket coaching team. She was the Head of Cheadle Hulme School, which she joined in September 2010. In September 2017, Pearson announced that she would step down from this role at the end of August 2018, joining The Football Association as Director of Education.

In 2016 she was appointed to the Board of the ECB as the Director responsible for women's cricket.

References

External links
 

1972 births
Living people
Alumni of Keble College, Oxford
Cricketers from King's Lynn
East Anglia women cricketers
England women One Day International cricketers
England women Test cricketers
England women Twenty20 International cricketers
People educated at Oakham School
Staffordshire women cricketers
Thames Valley women cricketers